Steven Paul Grissom (born June 26, 1963) is an American former stock car racing driver. Grissom was the 1993 Busch Series champion and has eleven Busch wins in 185 starts. He turned down a scholarship to play quarterback at the University of Alabama to focus a career on racing.

Early years 
Grissom began his racing career as a youth, working on cars with his father Wayne, who was a sponsor of short track drivers in their home state of Alabama. He soon began racing cars himself, balancing that with being captain of his high school football and basketball teams in 1981. He eventually joined the Winston All-Pro Series, and won the championship in 1985. The next season, he was nominated for Alabama Pro Athlete of the Year.

Busch Championship 
Grissom made his Busch Series debut in 1986 at the Freedlander 200, in the No. 31 Oldsmobile owned by his father. He started 16th but finished 30th due to engine failure. He ran three more races over the next two years, his best finish being an 11th. In 1988, he moved into the series full-time. Despite a lack of major sponsorship, Grissom had four top-tens and finished 13th in points. In 1989, he landed funding from Texas Pete Sauces, and moved to twelfth in points.

In 1990, Grissom won four races, including two straight, and finished third in points behind Chuck Bown and Jimmy Hensley. During the season, Grissom ran one Winston Cup race for Dick Moroso at the Atlanta Journal 500, starting 23rd and finishing 24th. A lack of funding kept Grissom from competing for the championship in 1991, as he had one win and slid back to tenth in points. After Channellock and Roddenberry's came on board in 1992, Grissom regained his success of 1990, winning two races. He clinched the Busch Series championship in 1993 for his family-owned team. Grissom won the championship by 253 points over Ricky Craven.

Winston Cup 
In 1993, Grissom ran an additional Cup race for Diamond Ridge Motorsports at New Hampshire International Speedway, finishing 29th. Grissom signed with Diamond Ridge to compete for Rookie of the Year honors in 1994. Despite struggles in qualifying, Grissom had three top-tens and was narrowly defeated by Jeff Burton for Rookie of the Year. Diamond Ridge also bought Grissom's Busch Series operation, and running a part-time schedule Grissom won twice and finished 26th in points in 1995. Grissom had four top-tens in the 1995 Cup season, finishing 27th in points; he started the season running in the top-10 points early on in the year. Grissom started 1996 off on a high note, winning the season-opening Busch Series race driving the WCW car, but he was released from Diamond Ridge after the Miller 400 race midway through the season.

For 1997, Grissom signed on with Larry Hedrick Motorsports. Grissom started the year winning the outside pole for the Daytona 500. As the season progressed, he finished in the top-ten six times and finished a career-high 21st in points. After he struggled throughout the 1998 season, he was released from his ride and ended the season driving the No. 96 for American Equipment Racing.

Grissom's No. 41 Chevrolet had a major crash during the Primestar 500. Grissom's car slid into the inside wall and flipped on the roof. The gas tank was detached by the impact, which flew across the racetrack, spilling gasoline. Which later ignited a fire by friction with Mike Wallace's car. Grissom was taken to the infield medical center, and released 45 minutes later. The fire was extinguished and the racing resumed about an hour later with 44 laps remaining.

After American Equipment closed its doors, Grissom started the 1999 season with LJ Racing in a four-race deal. After his contract was not renewed, he spent the season doing fill-in duty for Carroll Racing, Travis Carter Motorsports, and Hensley Motorsports, among others.

In 2000, Grissom was hired by Petty Enterprises to drive their No. 43 Dodge Ram in the Craftsman Truck Series. This year was best known as when Tony Roper turned into Grissom's bumper and hit the wall head-on at Texas Motor Speedway, then hitting Roper's truck as it slid down the track. Roper died of injuries he sustained from the crash the next morning. While he did not visit victory lane, Grissom finished in the top-five six times and finished tenth in points. He also ran in the Cup series, filling in for Kyle Petty in the No. 44 Hot Wheels Pontiac Grand Prix. After spending virtually all of 2001 on the sidelines, he was called back to Petty in 2002 to replace Buckshot Jones in the No. 44. In ten starts, he posted one top-ten at Richmond International Raceway. He has not run a Cup race since. That season, Grissom ran seven Nationwide Series races for Frank Cicci Racing, then spent 2003 at DCT Motorsports. After being released from DCT midway through 2004, he finished the year at GIC-Mixon Motorsports. He finished 28th in points that season.

Late career 
In 2005, Grissom joined with Jay Robinson Racing to drive the No. 49 Advil Ford Taurus. Despite not finishing in the top-ten Grissom was able to land a 23rd-place finish in points. Unfortunately, he and his team came under controversy due to their tendency to qualify for races on the "Past Champion's Provisional", a starting spot set aside for past champions in the Busch Series who fail to qualify on time. Grissom ran two races for Robinson on a part-time basis in 2006, and drove the season opening races in 2007 and 2008, for Cicci Racing and MSRP Motorsports respectively. In 2009, he drove for Davis Motorsports in the No. 0 Chevy at Bristol.

Grissom's son Kyle is also a racing driver, having competed in the ARCA Racing Series.

Grissom's father and team owner, Wayne, died on August 21, 2021, at age 86.

Motorsports career results

NASCAR
(key) (Bold – Pole position awarded by qualifying time. Italics – Pole position earned by points standings or practice time. * – Most laps led.)

Winston Cup Series

Daytona 500

Nationwide Series

Craftsman Truck Series

References

External links
 

Living people
1963 births
Sportspeople from Gadsden, Alabama
Racing drivers from Alabama
NASCAR drivers
NASCAR Xfinity Series champions
American Speed Association drivers
ASCAR drivers
Alabama Gang